This is a list of Harlequin Romance novels released in 2005.

Releases

References 

Romance novels
Lists of novels
2005 novels